In game theory, the common ways to describe a game are the normal form and the extensive form. The graphical form is an alternate compact representation of a game using the interaction among participants.

Consider a game with  players with  strategies each. We will represent the players as nodes in a graph in which each player has a utility function that depends only on him and his neighbors. As the utility function depends on fewer other players, the graphical representation would be smaller.

Formal definition
A graphical game is represented by a graph , in which each player is represented by a node, and there is an edge between two nodes  and   iff their utility functions are dependent on the strategy which the other player will choose. Each node  in  has a function , where  is the degree of vertex .   specifies the utility of player  as a function of his strategy as well as those of his neighbors.

The size of the game's representation
For a general  players game, in which each player has  possible strategies, the size of a normal form representation would be . The size of the graphical representation for this game is  where  is the maximal node degree in the graph. If , then the graphical game representation is much smaller.

An example
In case where each player's utility function depends only on one other player:

The maximal degree of the graph is 1, and the game can be described as  functions (tables) of size . So, the total size of the input will be .

Nash equilibrium
Finding Nash equilibrium in a game takes exponential time in the size of the representation. If the graphical representation of the game is a tree, we can find the equilibrium in polynomial time. In the general case, where the maximal degree of a node is 3 or more, the problem is NP-complete.

Further reading 

 Michael Kearns (2007) "Graphical Games". In 
 Michael Kearns, Michael L. Littman and Satinder Singh (2001) "Graphical Models for Game Theory".

Game theory